The 1996–97 Wisconsin Badgers men's basketball team represented the University of Wisconsin–Madison as a member of the Big Ten Conference during the 1996-97 NCAA Division I men's basketball season. Head coach Dick Bennett completed his second season coaching with the Badgers. The team played its home games in Madison, Wisconsin at the UW Field House. Wisconsin finished the season 18–10, 11–7 in Big Ten play to finish tied for fourth place. The Badgers received an at-large bid to the NCAA tournament as a No. 7 seed in the East Region, where they were defeated in the first round by No. 10 seed Texas.

Season summary 
Wisconsin won 18 regular season games for only the second time in school history and recorded a winning Big Ten record for the first time since 1974. The Badgers finished as the Big Ten's top defensive squad, surrendering only 55.3 points-per-game over the entire season and 56.8 points-per-game on 39.7 percent shooting during conference play. They overcame the absence of two promising wing players with a strong frontcourt featuring lone senior Paul Grant, a 7-foot transfer from Boston College, at center. Grant led the team in scoring (12.5 ppg), while leading rebounder Sam Okey (8.5 rpg) and junior Sean Daugherty manned the forward spots as the second and third leading scorers, respectively.

A highlight of a 6–0 start was when junior guard Sean Mason scored all 18 of his points in the second half and overtime to win at Temple, 64–57. The Badgers dropped two contests when Okey and guard Ty Calderwood took turns missing one game apiece, but the team's first loss at full strength came on the road to No. 15 Minnesota in the 10th game of the season. Wisconsin responded two nights later by using a 17–0 opening run to topple No. 12 Indiana, 71–58, to snap a 31-game losing streak to the Hoosiers.

Calderwood made a pair of memorable game-winning plays during his junior year. On February 26, 1997, he hit a three-pointer with seven seconds remaining to beat Iowa, 49–48, to extend Wisconsin's Big Ten winning streak to six games. In the regular season finale, Calderwood sank two free throws and then poked the ball away on the following defensive possession to upset No. 2 Minnesota, 66–65.

Wisconsin earned a No. 7 seed in the NCAA Tournament, only its second bid in 56 years, but the Badgers lost to No. 10 seed Texas, 71–58, in a first-round game in Pittsburgh.

Notable injuries 
Mason was Wisconsin's leading scorer (12.3 ppg) through three games when he went down with a season-ending ACL injury to his left knee in the opening minutes against Brown on December 7, 1996. He then redshirted. It was the second straight year Mason's season ended early due to an ACL injury.

Still recovering from the severely dislocated left knee cap he suffered in Wisconsin's first round NIT game the previous season, junior Mosezell Peterson sat the entire year as a medical redshirt. Peterson never suited up for the Badgers again as a result of the foot drop he developed, accepting a student assistant role the following season.

Awards 
All-Big Ten
 Sam Okey - 2nd team (media) and 3rd team (coaches)
Paul Grant - Honorable mention (media and coaches)

Big Ten Player of the Week
 Sam Okey - Week of December 16

Roster 

*Earned 1-year scholarship for '96-97

 *awarded one-year scholarship prior to season

Schedule 

|-
!colspan=8 style=""| Regular Season

|-
!colspan=8 style=""|NCAA tournament

Player statistics

Records and trivia 
Wisconsin went 5–2 against teams ranked in the AP Top 25.

Calderwood tallied 63 steals in 27 games to lead the Big Ten with a 2.33 steals-per-game average.

Prior to the season, Bennett awarded one-year scholarships to four walk-ons from the 1995-96 roster: juniors David Burkemper, Adam Schafer, Brian Vraney, and sophomore Mike Kosolcharoen. This brought the number of scholarship athletes on the 1996-97 roster to the allowed maximum of 13.

References 

Wisconsin
Wisconsin Badgers men's basketball seasons
Wisconsin
Wisconsin Badgers men's b
Wisconsin Badgers men's b